The Sokyr is a river in the Karaganda Region, Kazakhstan.

The river is one of the main tributaries of the Sherubainura, Nura basin. It flows across Bukhar-Zhyrau District in the Karaganda coal basin area. Its water is not suitable for drinking, but it serves the purpose of watering local livestock.

Course 
The Sokyr has its sources in an artesian aquifer near Kumiskudyk,  to the east of Karakudyk (Қарақұдық) village. It heads initially southwestwards with low hills rising above its right bank and a plain on the left bank. Midway through its course it bends roughly to the WNW, flows past the southern outskirts of Karaganda city and bends to the northwest. Its main tributaries are the Bukpa, Ashchylayrik and Karagandinka. Finally, the Sokyr reaches the Sherubainura and enters it from the right bank near Karazhar (Қаражар). The last stretch of the river often stops flowing, splitting into disconnected pools before it dries up.

The Sokyr freezes between early November and April. The river is fed by rainfall and snow.

Fauna
The main fish species in the Sokyr include crucian carp, pike, perch, roach and karabalik.

See also
List of rivers of Kazakhstan

References

External links

Kuldeeva E. M. On the artificial replenishment of groundwater reserves in the Sherubai-Nur valley in Central Kazakhstan

Rivers of Kazakhstan
Karaganda Region
Tengiz basin